José Fórmica-Corsi Cuevas (11 April 1881 – 5 November 1954) was a Spanish rower. He competed in the men's coxed four event at the 1900 Summer Olympics.

References

External links

1881 births
1954 deaths
Spanish male rowers
Olympic rowers of Spain
Rowers at the 1900 Summer Olympics
Rowers from Barcelona
Real Club Marítimo de Barcelona rowers